4-Androstenediol, also known as androst-4-ene-3β,17β-diol, is an androstenediol that is converted to testosterone. The conversion rate is about 15.76%, almost triple that of 4-androstenedione, due to utilization of a different enzymatic pathway. There is also some conversion into estrogen, since testosterone is the metabolic precursor of the estrogens.

4-Androstenediol is closer to testosterone structurally than 5-androstenediol, and has androgenic effects, acting as a weak partial agonist of the androgen receptor. However, due to its lower intrinsic activity in comparison, in the presence of full agonists like testosterone or dihydrotestosterone (DHT), 4-androstenediol has antagonistic actions, behaving more like an antiandrogen.

4-Androstenediol is very weakly estrogenic. It has approximately 0.5% and 0.6% of the affinity of estradiol at the ERα and ERβ, respectively.

Medical and commercial use
Patrick Arnold holds a 1999 patent on "Use of 4-androstenediol to increase testosterone levels in humans".

References

Androgens and anabolic steroids
Androstanes
Estrogens
Prodrugs
World Anti-Doping Agency prohibited substances